Bernino relates to several articles and is the male simple form of pluralis Bernini (Italian family name):
 Bernino (mountain pass) – a mountain pass in Sweitzerland.
 Bernino (male name) – after the Bernini family.
 Franco Bernino – a writer.
 Bernini - an Italian family name, most famous is the artist Gian Lorenzo Bernini which works include decorations for the St. Peters church in Rome.